Kalu Onu Kama Onyioha (born in Nkporo, in present-day Abia State Nigeria), commonly referred to as K.O.K. Onyioha was the supreme Spiritual leader and founder of Godianism, religion also known as Chiism.

References 

Nigerian religious leaders
Founders of new religious movements
Modern pagans